Lilium humboldtii, or Humboldt's lily, is a species of lily native to the US state of California and the Mexican state of Baja California. It is named after naturalist and explorer Alexander von Humboldt.

Description
The plant flowers in June, with flowers growing in a pyramidal inflorescence. The flowers are on stout stems, which are sometimes brown-purple. The subrhizomatous bulb is large, with yellowish-white scales, and grows very deep in the soil. The leaves grow in whorls, and are undulate, shiny, and oblanceolate. It is summer-deciduous, dying back after flowering in mid- to late summer.

Subspecies
Lilium humboldtii subsp. humboldtii - central California
Lilium humboldtii subsp. ocellatum - southern California, Baja California

Both subspecies are on the California Native Plant Society Inventory of Rare and Endangered Plants of California and described as "fairly endangered in California".

Albert Kellogg, unaware that the plant had already been named by Roezl and Leichtlin, gave it the name Lilium bloomerianum. For some time afterward, the name was still applied to the southern California Lilium humboldtii subsp. ocellatum.

Cultivation
Lilium humboldtii is sold as a garden bulb. It prefers dry summer dormancy, with no water after blooming, good drainage, and part shade. It was one of the parents, along with Lilium pardalinum, that produced the Bellingham hybrid lilies, which eventually resulted in the popular 'Shuksan' and 'Star of Oregon' lilies.

References

Harlow, Nora, Jakob, Kristin, and Raiche, Roger (2003) "Wild Lilies, Irises, and Grasses". University of California Press.

External links

USDA Plants Profile: Lilium humboldtii
Treatment from the Jepson Manual - Lilium humboldtii
CalFlora Taxon Report: Lilium humboldtii
Lilium humboldtii - CalPhotos gallery
iucnredlist

humboldtii
Flora of California
Flora of Baja California
Natural history of the California chaparral and woodlands
Garden plants of North America
Drought-tolerant plants
Flora without expected TNC conservation status